The Durban tramway network formed part of the public transport system in Durban, South Africa, for nearly 70 years until the end of the 1940s.

History
From , the network was converted to electrical power.

See also

History of Durban
List of town tramway systems in Africa
Rail transport in South Africa
Trolleybuses in Durban

References

Notes

Further reading

External links

Passenger rail transport in South Africa
Durban
Transport in Durban
Durban